Craig Robertson may refer to:

 Craig Robertson (footballer) (born 1963), Scottish former football player and coach
 Craig Robertson (American football) (born 1988), American football linebacker
 Craig Robertson (writer), see Bouchercon XLVII

See also
 Craig Robinson (disambiguation)